Bert Lee (1880–1946) was a songwriter.

Bert or Bertram Lee may also refer to:

 Bert Lee (footballer) (1879–1958), English footballer 
 Bert Lee (musician), pseudonym of American songwriter and musician Bert Lown (1903–1962)
 Bert Lee (sportscaster), on-air name of American sportscaster Bertram Lebhar Jr. (1907–1972)
 Bertram Lee, business partner of Peter Bynoe

See also
Albert Lee (disambiguation)
Robert Lee (disambiguation)
Herbert Lee (disambiguation)
Hubert Lee, soldier